Les Femmes is a 1969 sex comedy film co-written and directed by Jean Aurel, starring Brigitte Bardot and Maurice Ronet. It recorded admissions of 505,292 in France.

Cast
 Brigitte Bardot as Clara 
 Maurice Ronet as Jérôme 
 Christina Holme as Marianne 
 Anny Duperey as Hélène 
 Jean-Pierre Marielle as L'éditeur 
 Tanya Lopert as Louise

Censorship
When Les Femmes was first released in Italy in 1970, the Committee for the Theatrical Review of the Italian Ministry of Cultural Heritage and Activities rated it as VM18: not suitable for children under 18. In order for the film to be screened publicly, the Committee imposed the following modifications: 1) Delete the naked scenes of Marianne lying in bed;
2) Reduce the sequence of the sexual intercourse between Jerome and Marianne who are naked; 3) Reduce the final sequence of the sexual intercourse between Jerome and Clare in order to avoid scenes in which she is naked and scenes of lustful caresses.
The reason for the age restriction, cited in the official documents, is that: even after the cuts, the movie is still imbued with eroticism and it is inappropriate to the sensitivity of a minor. The official document number is: 55377, it was signed on 20 January 1970 by Minister Domenico Magrì.

References

External links
 

1969 films
1969 comedy films
1960s sex comedy films
1960s French-language films
French sex comedy films
Italian sex comedy films
Nudity in film
1960s French films
1960s Italian films